Provincial Road 235 is a former provincial road in the Canadian province of Manitoba.

Route description 

PR 235 connected PTH 5 at the eastern edge of Ste. Rose Du Lac to PTH 6 near the community of Mulvhill. The most notable portion of PR 235 was the bridge over Lake Manitoba at The Narrows.

For a more detailed description of the route, please refer to the Travel Route section for PTH 68.

History

PR 235 was decommissioned in its entirety when PTH 68 was extended to its current westbound terminus in 1987.

References

235